Unintentional is a 2021 Nigerian romantic drama film directed by Olufemi Bamigbetan, written by Zeina Otonjo, produced by Obinna Okerekeocha and Bola Atta as Executive Producer and stars Efa Iwara, Omowumi Dada and Beverly Osu

Unintentional is the first feature film by United Bank for Africa's lifestyle and entertainment channel, REDTV (Online TV channel) and was released on YouTube on boxing day, December 26, 2021.

Plot
Filmed in Enugu State, Nigeria, the movie delves into the lives of two young African girls on a road trip that leads to the discovery of love in the most expected place. Unintentional is a feel-good, love story that follows Sefi Madaki (played by Omowumi Dada) and her best friend Rosy (Beverly Osu) on a journey of self-discovery after a tumultuous heartbreak during the start of their National Youth Service year.

Cast

Release
The official trailer for the film was released on 20 December 2021 and Unintentional premiered on YouTube on Boxing Day, 26 December 2021.

Critical reception
Unintentional received reviews from critics.

According to Flora Nnamaka of Nigerian content review “This film had a good storyline. I totally love how realistic and relatable it was. It was conventional yet “new” the plot is. This is a typical love story but with some twists and turns here and there. Which in my opinion is really the juice of the story.”

Okediran Adeyemi of What Kept Me Up had this to say “In Unintentional, the writer has a great idea, and the beauty of it is they have the right cast to bring the idea to reality. The movie immerses the audience who are not from the Eastern soil—to the air, the characters breathe and everything in between— such as the introduction to Uzor and his family, other little details with his brother cleaning his car and over to Rosie and Sofie’s bus journey that highlights roadside spectacle like the palm wine visuals, and the panning in on the bus passengers vehemently complaining about the frequent stops.”

See also
 List of Nigerian films of 2021

References

External links
 
 

2021 films
English-language Nigerian films
2021 drama films
2020s English-language films